"Centipede" is a song from the Knife Party EP Rage Valley. Upon its release, it hit #47 on Billboard's Dance/Electronic Songs.

Background
The song sampled a segment from the Discovery Channel series The World's Most Feared Animals.
This sample was also used in Tarantula / Fasten Your Seatbelt.

In popular culture
The song was featured on the television series The Wrong Mans as well as the video game Guitar Hero Live.  The song is popular in the rhythm games "Beat Saber" and "osu!" During the 2016 United States presidential election, the song was associated with Donald Trump, especially its use in the video series "You Can't Stump the Trump". The terms "centipede" and "nimble navigator" were also used by Trump supporters on /r/The Donald subreddit.

Charts

References 

2012 songs
Songs written by Rob Swire